Karjat is the municipal council in Raigad district, Maharashtra.

History
The Karjat municipal council established in 1992.

Municipal Council election

Electoral performance 2019

References 

Municipal councils in Maharashtra
Raigad district